Egyptian Ratscrew (ERS) or Slap is a modern American card game of the matching family and popular with children. The game is similar to the 19th-century British card game beggar-my-neighbour, with the added concept of "slapping" cards when certain combinations are played, similar to and perhaps borrowed from Slapjack.

Rules 
The game is played with a standard 52-card deck or with multiple standard decks shuffled together for larger numbers of players. The number of players is limited only by each player's ability to reach the central pile at an arm's length. Each player is dealt a number of cards; cards are dealt as evenly as possible. As a variation, one or more Jokers may be added to ensure an even deal or to change gameplay.

Players are not allowed to look at their cards at any time, even when playing a card from their hand. The player to the left of the dealer begins by placing a card face-up, always from the top of their deck, to start a central discard pile. When playing a card, the player must reveal the card to all players at the same time by flipping the card away from themselves before placing it onto the pile face-up. Penalties may apply if the player reveals a card they play toward themselves first. Alternative to this, as hands with bad technique are more directly above the cards they place, any player can slap the hands of such players down, resulting in a penalty for the player whose hand is on the bottom as they will likely have incorrectly slapped - see versions of this later in article.

Play proceeds around the circle and each player takes turns laying down one card on the central pile at a time until a face card or Ace is played (making that player the "challenger" for that moment in play). The next player (the "challenged") then has a number of chances to play another face card or Ace, as follows: four chances after an Ace, three after a King, two after a Queen, and one after a Jack. Some play with four chances after an Ace, three after a Jack, two after a Queen, and one after a King. The challenged player plays their cards, one at a time, until they either draw another face card onto the pile or exhausts all of their allowed chances. If the challenged player is able to play a face card or Ace, the next player in turn order must beat it; if the initial face card could not be beaten in its allotted number of cards, the last challenger who placed it takes the pile.

Any player who takes a pile is always the one to start the next pile. When taken, piles are always added to a player's deck underneath, face-down, without being shuffled first.

The player who collects every card in the deck wins the game.

Slapping
In addition to the basic progression of play, players should agree beforehand on certain card combinations that, when played, entitle whoever slaps the pile first to subsequently claim it. The simplest and most common combination is the Double (any two cards of equal rank). Other common combinations include Sandwich (a double with one card of a different rank between the two, commonly used as a rule for small children who need help in winning ), Hoagie (a double with two cards of a different rank between the two), Run (three or more cards in ascending or descending order of rank; e.g. 7, 6, 5; 10, Jack, Queen), Flush (three or more cards of the same suit), Tens (two cards with ranks adding up to 10), Top Bottom (the first card played is played again later on), and Marriage (King and Queen on top of each other).

Additionally, slaps can be added for other types of conditions, such as suit/colour (the same three/four times in a row, respectively), or for being the same as the initial card (e.g. a 3 at any time when if first card played was a three; to make this less common, a suit/colour can also be specified, e.g. a red three if the first three played was red). Another condition that can be added is when meeting a challenge if the number of the card played (e.g. the second card played) matches the card's value (in this case, a two), then this is slap-able. For even more confusion, jokers can be differentiated, e.g. the red joker is an instant slap but the black joker challenges with 13 chances.

For a legitimate slap, the player to react the fastest and slap the pile first claims the pile. If multiple players slap simultaneously with no discernible victor, then the player whose hand is under all of the others or has the most contact with the cards by comparison takes the pile. 

Hands must be entirely withdrawn before the pile may be slapped. It is considered unfair to hover one's hand too close to the pile and slap frequently. 

Optional rules which negate this include slapping with the hand not delivering the card to the pile, Redneck Rules (wherein players, or convicted players, must bring their hand to their foreheads before being able to slap with that hand), or sleuthing or burning cards (putting the top card of the offending player's own deck on the bottom of the pile) as punishment for illegitimate slaps.

Player elimination
Players who have no cards left to play are eliminated. If a player has fewer cards than chances left while trying to counter a face card and runs out of their deck without countering, either the next player continues attempting to counter the face card with the current chances left or that particular play ends and the pile goes to the player who laid down the face card.

Even without cards, eliminated players can "slap in" on any appropriate card combination and re-enter the game as long as there are at least two people still containing cards. If the last remaining active person runs out of cards while trying to counter a face card and is unsuccessful, the pile goes to the player who played the face card and the player who has all the cards plays 3 more cards for one last chance for the opponent to slap back in.

Penalties
The player who slaps the pile when the card combination does not merit a slap must discard one or more of their cards and place them face-up at the bottom of the pile, then play resumes according to the card last played. Alternatively, if the player is caught taking cards or slapping illegally, the play can be contested: if the play was legal, any players who contested the play must give the top card of their deck to the contested player, while if the play was illegal, the contested player must give a card from the top of their deck to each player that contested the play, and the round continues. Cards gained in this way are, as usual, placed at the bottom of the player's deck. This, as well as adding a small element of bluffing into the game, helps to keep the play fast by both discouraging people from slapping incorrectly and discouraging people from always claiming another has done so and asking to check.

Players with no cards get a strike for each illegitimate slap and after the third strike, become unable to slap in until the next game or, in another variation, "burn their hands" (placing the hand on the bottom of the pile and waiting to be slapped). In this variation, once the pile is awarded or someone slaps, the offender's hand must no longer stay under the pile, and they can resume trying to slap/snap back in.

If cards are played out of turn, these cards become dead cards. They can be either placed at the bottom of the pile or left alone wherever they land. Either way, dead cards do not make for legitimate slaps. Any slap over a dead card, even if a player intentionally places it out of turn, results in a penalty. Penalty cards may be placed at the top of the deck as dead cards to create more confusion and potential illegitimate slaps.

In some cases, this same penalty is applied to certain rule violations, such as putting down a card when it is not one's turn and accidentally drawing multiple cards from one's deck and putting them on the pile.

Strategies
Memorising may help players recognize slapping possibilities before cards are set onto the pile. For example, if a game has only two players and one player legitimately slaps a double, the other player may recognize that, later on in the game, the double will arise later on as a sandwich that can then be slapped.

Some players may also intentionally fake a slap, since in doing so a player can possibly convince another player to slap incorrectly as well, or obtain an advantageous position in the deck that the player remembered from previous pile collections in the game.

While gaining the entire deck is the object, it is virtually always advantageous to have a deck as rich in face cards as possible with as few non-face cards as possible; the chances are then higher that the player will play a face card (whether to become the first challenger, or to counter a face card as the challenged player). Non-face cards (often referred to as "filler") are disadvantageous as they dilute the face cards in the player's deck, possibly causing them to lose a desirable pile by not being able to counter a face card. This may lead players to refrain from slapping on card combinations if there are no face cards in the pile. They may find it more beneficial to take the slaps available, but it is player preference.

Also, when someone plays a face card, that person may want to slap on the last card dropped thereafter, (1st for Jack, 2nd for Queen, 3rd for King and 4th for Ace), regardless of knowing what that card might be. This strategy is profitable because the reward of the pile outweighs the risk of "burning" a card. This strategy is also known as a risk slap. The risk slap may be used by players who have a noticeable lead in cards and are comfortable with sacrificing one card on the chance they might gain the pile which they slapped. One counterstrategy is moving a card toward the pile quickly without putting it down on the last card dropped on a face card in order to provoke a risk slap. In case the next card is a face card, the player who has "burned" a card likely will not get it back unless they slap the pile or the challenges come back around the table to them. In some games, it may even be permissible to slap the final card, with no penalty.

Additionally, a player can intentionally slap incorrectly to "burn" a card or two leading up to a face card remembered from earlier in the game. This is especially useful if the preceding player has played a high value face card such as a jack, where there is only one chance to play a face card.

See also

Ninety-nine (addition card game)
Snip Snap Snorem

References

Further reading

War group
Catch and collect games
Two-player card games
Year of introduction missing